The Air Force is a range of athletic shoes made by Nike that began with the Air Force 1 and went on to include the Air Force 2, Air Force 3, Air Force STS, Air Force 5,  Air Force XXV and Air Force 09. The Air Force 1 was created by designer Bruce Kilgore and was the first basketball shoe to use the Nike Air technology. The shoe is offered in low, mid and high-top styles.

Description
The shoes are sold in 5 different styles: super low, low, mid, high, and super high. The mid comes with a connected strap. The high-top Air Force 1s come with a velcro strap; the mid-top strap is secured to the shoe while the high-top's strap is movable and removable on some versions. Although the shoe comes in different colors and color schemes, the most common Air Force 1s sold are solid white (also referred to as "white on white"), the second most common being solid black ("black on black").

Another identifying characteristic of an Air Force 1 shoe is a small medallion secured to the bottom of the laces but with holes on both sides so it can be removed by sliding it off the shoe lace. The medallion is engraved with the inscription "AF-1", with the year "'82" inscribed beside it, and has historically been made out of a silver-colored metal (perhaps pewter). Its original design was more circular, but after a redesign the Air Force 1's 25th anniversary in 2007 the medallion is now rectangular. (The redesign also involved encasing the inscription in white plastic; that was discarded in favor of the original medallion material.)

History
Bruce Kilgore designed the shoe, which was never originally called the Air Force; the name is a reference to Air Force One, the plane that carries the President of the United States. Nike Air Force 1s were originally considered the favored shoe of inner-city youth, especially in Harlem, New York, giving rise to the nickname "lushy lushaba".

The Air Force 1 was produced in 1982 and discontinued in 1984. It was re-released in 1986 with the modern italic Nike logo with a "Swoosh" revenue on the bottom on the back of the shoe. Little has changed to the Air Force One since its creation in 1982, although the stitching on the side panels of earlier versions is no longer present. Since its creation over 1,700 color variations have been produced, bringing in an estimated annual revenue of US$800 million. The selling of the Air Force Ones online by some retailers used to be prohibited by Nike, which restricted supply; the shoe may now be sold online.

Performance use
As a performance shoe, the AF1 is still used for street play as well as for professional play. NBA players Jerry Stackhouse (who now wears Adidas) and Rasheed Wallace have worn AF1s on court. The shoe is also used for fashion and casual wear.

In music
St. Louis Rapper Nelly and his group, St. Lunatics, collaborated on a 2002 single titled "Air Force Ones" about the shoes. The shoe is also a focus of the 2007 single "Classic (Better Than I've Ever Been)", a collaboration between Kanye West, Nas, Rakim and KRS-One, that was produced by DJ Premier. "Black Air Force 2's" are mentioned in the second line of the lyrics of the 2008 single "Dope Boys", released from The Game's third studio album, LAX.

Aftermarket sales
The Air Force One has become a favorite of sneaker collectors, often referred to as sneakerheads. Certain rare styles can cost several times their retail value.

Controversy
Nike has vigorously defended the Air Force 1 in U.S. courts. In one case, it sued an alleged infringer of its trademark in the Air Force 1, who responded by filing a counterclaim to invalidate the Air Force 1 trademark. Several months later, apparently fearful that the defendant's counterclaim could succeed, Nike dismissed all its claims with prejudice and gave the defendant a "Covenant Not To Sue". The issue that went up on appeal was whether Nike's tactics had thereby rendered the entire dispute moot (meaning there was no longer an active case or controversy), so that the U.S. federal courts had been deprived of jurisdiction to hear the defendant's counterclaim. On January 9, 2013, the U.S. Supreme Court unanimously ruled in Nike's favor.

Later versions

The Air Force 2 shoe introduced in 1987 is a newer variation of the original. The shoe is a typical flat-soled, casual-wear sneaker that can be made in many different variations of colors. Also, Air Force 2s were re-released internationally in the early 2000s. They can be made in either the low-cut or high-top style.

The shoe can be custom made in any color, but typically it has either a white or black based background with almost any color used to fill in the Nike Swoosh and back heel.

The Air Force 3 introduced in 1988 was the most popular version of Air Force series. It was worn by many basketball players at the time. The Air Force III was more rugged looking and more durable than the previous two versions. The original colorway was white/medium grey/black, however several other colors were introduced shortly after. An actual "Air FORCE" logo was introduced on this model as well, with an image of half of a basketball on the tongue. This logo would be used on the rest of the Air Force series. The Air Force III was re-issued in 2006 in a very limited edition of colorways of the high top, and several colorways for the low top version.

The Air Force STS (also known as Air Force 4 or Air Force IV) was introduced in 1989. It may be a reference to the Space Transportation System, the official name for the Space Shuttle. It was regularly worn by David Robinson in his rookie year. The Air Force STS features Nike's elephant print and is also slightly higher than the first three versions of the Air Force series.
The Air Force 5 was introduced in 1990. The Air Force V was the first model to make the airbag visible on the side heels of the shoe. The most popular colorway was white/medium grey/black/orange. Just like the previous version it was slightly higher than the first three versions. This was also the last original Air Force model to be made.

Retro versions

In 2007, for the 25th anniversary of the original Air Force 1, Nike created the Air Force XXV, which took inspiration from the original Air Force 1 invented in 1982. This version featured a mismatched set of medallions to commemorate its twenty fifth anniversary; one being from the original Air Force 1s with the other from the Air Force 25s. Since its introduction, many different Air Force 1 have been signed or inspired by celebrities and athletes.

Also in 2007, to further commemorate the 25th anniversary of the Air Force One, two high-end makes of the shoe were introduced. They were hand-crafted in Italy, one from crocodile leather and the other from anaconda leather, and both were adorned with gold-tipped laces. They were sold in extremely limited quantities and had a list price of $2000, making them some of the most expensive sneakers ever to enter the marketplace.

In 2009, Nike created Air Force 09, an update of the original shoe. The shoe comes in a solid black or white.

In 2010, Nike commissioned DJ Clark Kent to design a Nike Air Force 1 Low pack of special limited edition Air Force 1 shoes.

In 2017, Nike partnered with Don C, Kareem “Biggs” Burke, Errolson Hugh, Travis Scott and Virgil Abloh for the 35th anniversary of the shoe.

In 2020, Nike released Tear-Away Air Force 1. Its customizable “Tear Away” sneaker released by company. Tear Away AF-1 reveal, stays true to the signature style 1982 and upper linings. The colorful spectrum hidden inside the thin white layer of upper.

Later on Nike released the option for AF-1 called "Custom Air Force 1, which allows buyer to design their own legacy by choosing premium leather or suede for any part of shoe, select the rubber traction type & finishing, and design each and every part of shoe to make a unique look by joining them together.

Along with designing, Nike allows even to change the back logo. The wearer can replace the “Air” with any three characters even can choose different characters for left and right.

In film and television
From 2008 to 2014, Jax Teller (played by Charlie Hunnam) wears his trademark white-on-white retro low-top Air Force 1s throughout Sons of Anarchy, until they are discarded in the final episode of the series.

In 2016, Quicksilver (played by actor Evan Peters) uses a custom silver-colored Air Force 1 in the movie X-Men: Apocalypse.

References

External links

 
 Customised Air Force 1

Products introduced in 1982
Nike brands
Sneaker culture
1980s fashion
1990s fashion
2000s fashion
2010s fashion
2020s fashion